Unione Nazionale is Italian for "National Union" and may refer to:

National Union (Italy, 1923), a pro-fascist Catholic party
National Union (Italy, 1924), an anti-fascist liberal party
National Union (Italy, 1947), a parliamentary group

See also 
 National Union (disambiguation)